The Cardinal Wiseman Catholic School, commonly known as  The Cardinal Wiseman School, is a Catholic school comprising a comprehensive secondary school and sixth form located in Greenford, London, England. Its headteacher is Daniel Coyle and its student body consists of 11 to 19-year-olds.

History 
It is named after the Catholic Cardinal Wiseman, a Cardinal Archbishop of Westminster in 1850. It was originally opened in 1959, but has been reorganised several times since, including an amalgamation with the Cardinal Newman School in 1986.

 The original Cardinal Wiseman School was opened in 1959 as a special agreement school catering for 456 boys and girls aged 11–15 years. Since then the school has been reorganised several times.
 In 1974, The London Borough of Ealing established a comprehensive school system with the age of transfer being 12+ years.
 In 1986, The Cardinal Wiseman School amalgamated with the Cardinal Newman School and gained Voluntary Aided status.
 In 1995, the DfEE inaugurated Cardinal Wiseman School as a 'Technology and Art College' following the successful application from the school. This has attracted considerable extra funding that is not normally available.
 In 1998, The Cardinal Wiseman School applied to have the status extended for a second term. Following an inspection visit by the DfEE Technology Colleges Unit to see if the earlier targets had been achieved, the School was granted a second term without any conditions being imposed (other than the new targets!). A third term of Technology status has since been awarded and in 2006 the school was awarded a second specialist status in the area of Humanities. Once again, considerable funding has been attracted to the school.

Location
It is located on Greenford Road in Greenford, near Greenford Broadway. There are many buses that stop close to it, including the E1, E2, E3, E5, E6, E7, E9, E10, E11, 92, 95, 105 and 282. It is next to, and often twinned with Our Lady of The Visitation Roman Catholic Primary School, and the Our Lady of the Visitation Church.

Uniform

Years 7 to 11
The students wear a uniform, consisting of a royal blue blazer, navy and white tie, white shirt, grey skirt (for girls) and charcoal trousers for boys. From April 2007, ties were not required to be worn during the summer term. However, this was a trial, and ties are now compulsory for all students all year. During the summer terms, girls can choose to wear summer blouses which they do not have to wear a tie with.

Sixth Form
The uniform for the Sixth Form differs to the lower school. Students are required to wear a black tie with the school crest over a plain white shirt with black trousers or skirts. They also can wear a black jumper over their shirt and tie.

Notable former pupils
Popular band The Magic Numbers attended Cardinal Wiseman, as well as Jason Roberts, former Premier League striker for Blackburn Rovers and Reading. Also, the professional football player Aaron Pierre, who plays defender for Wycombe Wanderers attended Cardinal Wiseman.

Power metal band DragonForce's keyboardist Vadim Pruzhanov attended Cardinal Wiseman.

Young actors James Forde, who plays Liam Butcher in the soap EastEnders, and Joe Prospero, who featured in Finding Neverland, My Dad's the Prime Minister and the Bill, attended the school.

Comedian Javone Prince, famous for starring as Jerwayne in PhoneShop, also attended the school.

An article in The Independent in November 2014 by former pupil Kris Griffiths highlighted the famous alumni produced by Cardinal Wiseman during a difficult time for the school, following a stabbing.

Arts Festival

Every year, the Music and Drama departments at Cardinal Wiseman organise a two night event at which numerous musicians and dancers come together to showcase the wealth of talent within the school community. This will normally take place on the Wednesday and Thursday of the first week of November, with auditions for acts occurring in mid September.

Monetary prizes are awarded for the best musicians and dancers in upper and lower school and one for the overall best performance. These are decided on the second night by a panel of judges that usually contains various professionals and ex-pupils, and also on occasion, famous celebrities also attend the show as judges.

References

External links
Cardinal Wiseman School Official Website
Ofsted profile of the school
Ealing Council information about the school
BBC League tables for the school
Department for Education and Skills statistics for the school
LinkedIn group

Secondary schools in the London Borough of Ealing
Catholic secondary schools in the Archdiocese of Westminster
Educational institutions established in 1959
1959 establishments in England
Voluntary aided schools in London